Baykal (port) is a rural locality (a settlement) in Slyudyansky District of Irkutsk Oblast, Russia, located near Lake Baikal on the left bank of the Angara River,  south of Irkutsk, the administrative center of the oblast. Population:

History
Baykal (port) had work settlement status until February 1, 2014, when it was demoted to a rural locality.

Transportation
The town is the terminus of the Circum-Baikal Railway. There is an automobile ferry to Listvyanka, a work settlement on the opposite side of the river.

References

Notes

Sources

Rural localities in Irkutsk Oblast
Populated places on Lake Baikal